Paul Jackson (born August 1, 1940) is a Canadian former professional ice hockey defenceman.

Jackson played  major junior ice hockey in the Ontario Hockey League, and was a member of the  Toronto St. Michael's Majors when they won the Memorial Cup in 1961. The following season he turned professional, playing the 1961–62 AHL season with the Pittsburgh Hornets.

References

External links

1940 births
Living people
Buffalo Bisons (AHL) players
Canadian ice hockey defencemen
Columbus Checkers players
Ice hockey people from Ontario
Pittsburgh Hornets players
San Francisco Seals (ice hockey) players
Sportspeople from Peterborough, Ontario
Springfield Kings players
Toronto St. Michael's Majors players